The Posterior ligament may refer to:
 Posterior sacroiliac ligament
 Posterior ligament of the head of the fibula
 Posterior ligament of the lateral malleolus
 Oblique popliteal ligament
 Posterior ligament of elbow